Marcgravia is a genus of plants in the Marcgraviaceae family commonly eaten by the dwarf little fruit bat. The genus is native to the Caribbean Islands, Central America, and South America, and genus is named in memory of the German naturalist Georg Marcgraf. The plant is visited by Thomas's nectar bat.

General information 
Marcgravia is a genus of terrestrial vines. It was named after George Marcgraf who first saw it on a voyage to Brazil. Marcgravia is classified as a sub-parasitical shrub. Marcgravia is pollinated by Thomas's nectar bat.
Marcgravia rectiflora, Marcgravia sintenisill, Marcgravia tobagensis and Marcgravi trinitatis are species of  Marcgravia.

Locations 
Belize, 
Bolivia, 
Brazil North, 
Brazil Northeast, 
Brazil South, 
Brazil Southeast, 
Brazil West-Central, 
Central American Pac, 
Colombia, 
Costa Rica, 
Cuba, 
Dominican Republic, 
Ecuador, 
French Guiana, 
Guatemala, 
Guyana, 
Haiti, 
Honduras, 
Jamaica,
Leeward Is., 
Mexico Central, 
Mexico Gulf, 
Mexico Southeast, 
Mexico Southwest, 
Nicaragua, 
Panamá, 
Peru, 
Puerto Rico, 
Suriname, 
Trinidad-Tobago, 
Venezuela, 
Windward Is

Marcgravia umbellata 

It is native to the Lesser Antilles islands in the eastern Caribbean and Anguilla.

Marcgravia pittieri 
Marcgravia pittieri is a species of Marcgravia which is visited by Thomas's nectar bat.

Marcgravia trianae 

Marcgravia trianae is a species of Marcgravia. It is a terrestrial plant commonly found in Venezuela.

Marcgravia evenia 

Marcgravia evenia is a species of Marcgravia found in Cuba. This species uses dish shaped leaves to attract bats to pollinate it.

Species

References 

 PPP species list
NCBI

 
Ericales genera
Taxonomy articles created by Polbot